Jammie Dodgers are a popular British biscuit, made from shortcake with a raspberry or strawberry flavoured jam filling. Introduced in 1960, they are currently produced by Burton's Biscuit Company at its factory in Llantarnam.
In 2009, Jammie Dodgers were the most popular children's sweet biscuit brand in the United Kingdom, with 40% of the year's sales consumed by adults.

Varieties
Jammie Dodgers have been sold in other flavours, including lemon, toffee, orange, chocolate, Vimto and "berry blast". Smaller versions of the biscuits have been sold in "lunchpack" bags. They introduced a new flavour in October 2020, called Gooey Apple.

History

Named after the character Roger the Dodger from The Beano comics, Jammie Dodgers have been produced in the United Kingdom for over 60 years, originally by Burton's Foods. In 2011, the brand was re-launched under the "Dodgers" umbrella with two new products: Toffee and Choccie.

Jammie Dodgers are a type of linzer biscuit, which is a biscuit-size version of a linzer torte, and they are often associated with the Christmas season in other parts of the world. One commercial example is Pepperidge Farm's seasonally available linzer raspberry cookie in the United States. In New Zealand, linzer cookies are called Shrewsbury biscuits; one example is the Cookie Bear Shrewsbury biscuit from Griffin's Foods. The term Shrewsbury biscuit refers to a different product elsewhere, however. Linzer cookies are also sold as raspberry shortbread cookies.

Advertising
The 2011 re-launch TV campaign received the "Best Biscuit Advert of 2011" reward from The Grocer magazine. Burton's launched a new advert for Choccie Dodgers in April 2012, during Britain's Got Talent, as part of a £4.5 million campaign.

Similar biscuits
In New Zealand, Griffin's sell "Shrewsbury" biscuits that are similar to Jammie Dodgers, with a hole (that may be heart shaped) in the top layer.

See also
 Happy Faces – a similar biscuit
 List of shortbread biscuits and cookies

References

External links
 Burton's Foods official website

Biscuit brands
Cookie sandwiches
Shortbread
Food and drink introduced in 1960